The Atlantic 10 women's basketball tournament is the conference championship tournament in women's basketball for the Atlantic 10 Conference (A-10). It is a single-elimination tournament involving all of the 14 league schools, and seeding is based on regular-season records with head-to-head match-up as a tie-breaker. The winner receives the conference's automatic bid to the NCAA women's basketball tournament.

The top eight teams in the conference receive byes in the first round, while #12 plays #13 and #11 plays #14. The top four teams receive byes in the second round, while #5 plays the winner of #12/#13, #6 plays the winner of #11/#14, #7 plays #10, and #8 plays #9. The winners of the second-round games move on to face one of the top four seeds in the format of a normal eight-team bracket: #1 vs. #8 or #9; #2 vs. #7 or #10; #3 vs #6, #11 or #14; and #4 vs #5, #12 or #13.

The tournament has been held since 1983.

Champions

Championship by School 

 Schools highlighted in pink are former members of the Atlantic 10
 Duquesne, Davidson, George Mason, La Salle, Loyola Chicago, Rhode Island, Richmond and St. Bonaventure have not yet won a tournament.
 Butler never won a tournament while a member of the Atlantic 10

See also
 Atlantic 10 men's basketball tournament

References